Arthralgia (from Greek arthro-, joint + -algos, pain) literally means joint pain. Specifically, arthralgia is a symptom of injury, infection, illness (in particular arthritis), or an allergic reaction to medication.

According to MeSH, the term "arthralgia" should only be used when the condition is non-inflammatory, and the term "arthritis" should be used when the condition is inflammatory.

Causes
The causes of arthralgia are varied and range,  from a joints perspective, from degenerative and destructive processes such as osteoarthritis and sports injuries to inflammation of tissues surrounding the joints, such as bursitis. These might be triggered by other things, such as infections or vaccinations.

Diagnosis
Diagnosis involves interviewing the patient and performing physical exams. When attempting to establish the cause of the arthralgia, the emphasis is on the interview. The patient is asked questions intended to narrow the number of potential causes. Given the varied nature of these possible causes, some questions may seem irrelevant. For example, the patient may be asked about dry mouth, light sensitivity, rashes or a history of seizures. Answering yes or no to any of these questions limits the number of possible causes and guides the physician toward the appropriate exams and lab tests.

Treatment
Treatment depends on a specific underlying cause. The underlying cause will be treated first and foremost. The treatments may include joint replacement surgery for severely damaged joints, immunosuppressants for immune system dysfunction, antibiotics when an infection is the cause, and discontinuing medication when an allergic reaction is the cause. When treating the primary cause, pain management may still play a role in treatment. The extent of its role varies depending on the specific cause of the arthralgia. Pain management may include stretching exercises, over the counter pain medications, prescription pain medication, or other treatments deemed appropriate for the symptoms.
Capsaicin, a substance found in chili peppers, may relieve joint pain from arthritis and other conditions. Capsaicin blocks the actions of substance P, which helps transmit pain signals, and capsaicin triggers the release of pain-blocking chemicals in the body known as endorphins. Side effects of capsaicin cream include burning or stinging in the area where it is applied. Another topical option is an arthritis cream containing the ingredient, methyl salicylate (Bengay).

See also
 Antiarthritics
 Myalgia

References

Rheumatology